This article lists all the Bristol Rovers Football Club seasons from 1892-1893 up to 2021–22.

Seasons

Notes
A. EFL Cup, EFL Trophy and Post-1900 FA Cup results from the Football Club History Database, pre-1900 FA Cup results are from The FA.
B. Eastville Rovers had two league points deducted in 1896–97 for paying a player.
C. Club was re-elected to the Football League after finishing bottom of Division 3 (South).
D. Two league points deducted in 1981–82 for fielding an unregistered player.
E. The 2019–20 season was curtailed due to the COVID-19 pandemic. The season's final standings were decided on points per game with Rovers scoring 1.29ppg.

References

Eastville Rovers Football Club History Database. Retrieved 3 May 2007.
Bristol Eastville Rovers Football Club History Database. Retrieved 3 May 2007.

Bibliography

Bristol Rovers